Eden is a residential settlement on the eastern edge of Carrickfergus in County Antrim, Northern Ireland, located within a larger electoral ward area of the same name. It is intersected by the Larne Road, a small section of the extensive Antrim Coast Road that connects Carrickfergus to Whitehead and the major ferry port of Larne.

Community projects 
In April 2008, Carrickfergus Borough Council established the Eden Allotments, a five hectare allotment site intended to be a hub of community activity as well as promoting gardening activities and 'home-grown' cultivation of vegetables. It has been highly publicised in local newspapers and has received praise from local government for its environmentally friendly aims. It is currently believed to be the largest allotment site on the island of Ireland.

Education 
Eden is served by Eden Primary School. The school is located on a 3.4-acre plot of land within residential Eden and takes children from a larger surrounding catchment area which includes Carrickfergus and occasionally Whitehead.

Transport 
Eden was served by Eden railway station until 1977, when NI Railways nationalised their services and closed many railway stations, including nearby Kilroot railway station. There is now no station between Downshire and Whitehead.

Notable residents 
 International footballer Willie Irvine (and most likely his brother Bobby) was born in Eden before moving to the Sunnylands estate in Carrickfergus.

See also 
 Carrickfergus
 List of villages in Northern Ireland

References 

Carrickfergus